Barbara Kowa is an Austrian actress. She was born on March 5, 1973, in Hannover, Germany.

Mainly known for her theater work in Germany, France, and Japan, Kowa has also worked in film and television. In 2004 she also worked with director Mike Figgis and starred in the independent thriller Deed Poll. She featured in cult-like roles in two Daryush Shokof films, A2Z, and Breathful, which had an all-women cast.

Filmography (selected) 
 Breathful
 A2Z
 Deed Poll
 Torso
 Goodbye Reagan

External links 
 
 Fan Site

1973 births
Living people
Austrian stage actresses
Austrian film actresses
Actors from Hanover
Austrian television actresses
Austrian expatriates in Germany